George Somers Clarke may refer to:

 George Somers Leigh Clarke (1822–1882), English architect
 Somers Clarke (1841–1926), English architect and Egyptologist

See also
George Clarke (disambiguation)
George Somers (disambiguation)